Sarajuy-ye Gharbi Rural District is in the Central District of Maragheh County, East Azerbaijan province, Iran. At the National Census of 2006, its population was 21,577 in 5,306 households. There were 23,836 inhabitants in 6,569 households at the following census of 2011. At the most recent census of 2016, the population of the rural district was 24,465 in 7,067 households. The largest of its 25 villages was Taleb Khan, with 2,848 people.

References 

Maragheh County

Rural Districts of East Azerbaijan Province

Populated places in East Azerbaijan Province

Populated places in Maragheh County